Tell Aristide Frédéric Antoine Chapel (July 1, 1849 - August 11, 1932) was a French General during World War I.

1849 births
1932 deaths
French generals
French military personnel of World War I